Amastra elongata was a species of air-breathing land snails, terrestrial pulmonate gastropod mollusks in the family Amastridae. This species was endemic to Oahu.

References

Amastridae
Extinct gastropods
Taxonomy articles created by Polbot